The musicians of the Titanic all perished when the ship sank in 1912. They played music, intending to calm the passengers, for as long as they possibly could, and all went down with the ship. All of the men were recognized for their heroism, especially during the final hours of the sinking.

Timeline
Eight musicians – members of a three-piece ensemble and a five-piece ensemble – were booked through C.W. & F.N. Black, in Liverpool. They boarded at Southampton and traveled as second-class passengers. They were not on the White Star Line's payroll but were contracted to White Star by the Liverpool firm of C.W. & F.N. Black, who placed musicians on almost all British liners. Until the night of the sinking, the players performed as two separate groups: a quintet led by violinist and official bandleader Wallace Hartley, that played at teatime, after-dinner concerts, and Sunday services, among other occasions; and the violin, cello, and piano trio of Georges Krins, Roger Bricoux, and Theodore Brailey, that played at the À La Carte Restaurant and the Café Parisien.

After the Titanic hit an iceberg and began to sink, Hartley and his fellow band members started playing music to help keep the passengers calm as the crew loaded the lifeboats. Many of the survivors said that Hartley and the band continued to play until the very end. Reportedly, their final tune was the hymn "Nearer, My God, to Thee". One second-class passenger said:  All eight musicians died in the sinking.

Musicians

William Brailey 

William Theodore Ronald Brailey (25 October 1887 – 15 April 1912) was an English pianist. Born on 25 October 1887 in Walthamstow in Greater London (then part of Essex), he was the son of William "Ronald" Brailey, a well-known figure of Spiritualism. Brailey studied piano at school, and one of his first jobs was performing in a local hotel.

In 1902, he joined the Royal Lancashire Fusiliers regiment signing for 12 years service as a musician. He was stationed in Barbados but left the army prematurely in 1907. He returned to England and lived at 71 Lancaster Road, Ladbroke Grove, London. Both men then joined the White Star Line and were recruited by Liverpool music agency C.W. and F.N. Black to serve on the Titanic. Brailey boarded the Titanic on Wednesday 10 April 1912 in Southampton. His ticket number was 250654, the ticket for all the members of Hartley's orchestra. His cabin was in the second class quarters.

Brailey was 24 years old when he died; his body was never recovered.

Roger Bricoux 

Roger Marie Bricoux (1 June 1891 – 15 April 1912) was a French cellist. Born on 1 June 1891 in Rue de Donzy, Cosne-Cours-sur-Loire, France, Bricoux was the son of a musician. The family moved to Monaco when he was a young boy, and he was educated in various Catholic institutions in Italy. It was during his studies that he joined his first orchestra and won first prize at the Conservatory of Bologna for musical ability. After studying at the Paris Conservatory, he moved to England in 1910 to join the orchestra in the Grand Central Hotel in Leeds. At the end of 1911, he moved to Lille, France, lived at 5 Place du Lion d'Or, and played in various locations throughout the city.

Before joining the Titanic, Bricoux had served with Brailey on the Cunard steamer Carpathia before joining the White Star Line. He boarded the Titanic on Wednesday 10 April 1912 in Southampton. His ticket number was 250654, the ticket for all the members of Hartley's orchestra. His cabin was second class, and he was the only French musician aboard the Titanic.

Bricoux was 20 years old when he died; his body was never recovered.

In 1913, after his apparent disappearance, he was declared a deserter by the French army. It was not until 2000 that he was eventually officially registered as dead in France, mainly due to the efforts of the Association Française du Titanic. On 2 November 2000, the same association unveiled a memorial plaque to Bricoux in Cosne-Cours-sur-Loire.

Wallace Hartley 

Wallace Henry Hartley (2 June 1878 – 15 April 1912), an English violinist, was the bandleader on the Titanic. Hartley's body was recovered by the CS Mackay-Bennett, before being returned to England for burial in his home town of Colne, Lancashire.

Jock Hume 

John Law "Jock" Hume (9 August 1890 – 15 April 1912) was a Scottish violinist. Hume was born on 9 August 1890 in Dumfries, Scotland and lived with his parents at 42 George Street, Dumfries. He had already played on at least five ships before the Titanic, and was recruited to play on its maiden voyage due to his good reputation as a musician.

He boarded the Titanic on Wednesday 10 April 1912 in Southampton. His ticket number was 250654, the ticket for all the members of Hartley's orchestra. His cabin was in the second class quarters.

Hume was 21 years old when he died and his fiancée, Mary Costin, was pregnant with his child. His body was recovered by the CS Mackay-Bennett, and was passed into the care of John Henry Barnstead who arranged for his burial in grave 193 of the designated Titanic plot at Fairview Cemetery, Halifax, Nova Scotia, Canada on 8 May 1912. A memorial was erected for Hume and Thomas Mullin (third class steward) in Dock Park, Dumfries. It reads:

Hume and the other members of Hartley's orchestra all belonged to the Amalgamated British Musicians Union and were employed by a Liverpool music agency, C.W. and F.N. Black, which supplied musicians for Cunard and the White Star Line. On 30 April 1912, Hume's father, Andrew, received the following note from the agency:

The letter caused controversy at the time when it was reprinted in the Amalgamated Musicians Union's monthly newsletter. Andrew Law Hume decided not to settle the bill.

In April 1914 John W. Furness, the violinist of the Canadian liner  made a pilgrimage with Anglican Church officials to visit the grave of John Law Hume at the Fairview Lawn Cemetery and pay his respects. Furness himself died in a shipwreck only a few weeks later when Empress of Ireland sank on 29 May 1914.

Georges Krins 

Georges Alexandre Krins (18 March 1889 – 15 April 1912) was a Belgian violinist. Born on 18 March 1889 in Paris, France, his family was from Belgium, and soon after his birth they moved back there to the town of Spa. He first studied at Academie de Musique de Spa. He then moved to the Conservatoire Royal de Musique in Liège, Belgium, where he studied from 30 October 1902 until 1908, when he won first prize for violin, with the highest distinction.

As a young man he wanted to join the army; however, his parents persuaded him otherwise. He worked in his father's shop and played in La Grande Symphonie, Spa, and in 1910 he moved to Paris to be first violin at Le Trianon Lyrique. He subsequently moved to London and played for two years at the Ritz Hotel until March 1912. He lived at 10 Villa Road, Brixton, London and became bandmaster of the Trio String Orchestra, which played near the Café Français. This led to his being recruited by CW & FN Black, Liverpool to play on the Titanic.

He boarded the Titanic on Wednesday 10 April 1912 in Southampton. His ticket number was 250654, the ticket for all the members of Hartley's orchestra. His cabin was second class, and he was the only Belgian musician aboard the Titanic. After the Titanic began to sink, Krins and his fellow band members assembled in the first class lounge and started playing music to help keep the passengers calm. They later moved to the forward half of the boat deck, where they continued to play as the crew loaded the lifeboats. Krins was 23 years old when he died. His body was never recovered.

Memorials

In media

Film
Two documentary films have been made about the Titanic's band.
 The British film, Titanic: The Band Played On (completed in 2012), was shown on Yesterday television.
 The American Film, Titanic–Band of Courage (2014), was shown on Public Broadcasting System stations.

Literature
Books written specifically about the Titanic'''s musicians include:
 Steve Turner's nonfiction book, The Band that Played On: The Extraordinary Story of the 8 Musicians Who Went Down with the Titanic (2011)
 Christopher Ward's non-fiction book, And the Band Played On: The Titanic Violinist and the Glovemaker: A True Story of Love, Loss and Betrayal (2011), which became a Sunday Times bestseller and was made into a documentary for the Discovery Channel titled, Titanic: The Aftermath (2012). The book details the story of Ward's grandfather, Jock Hume.
 Erik Fosnes Hansen's fiction book Psalm at Journey's End, tells the story about the individual musicians that ended their careers and lives on the Titanic.

Music
 Chamber music ensemble I Salonisti performs Titanic repertoire on the album And the Band Played On (Music Played on the Titanic) (1997), including the Intermezzo from Cavalleria Rusticana. The White Star orchestra played this famous piece from Mascagni's opera after dinner in Titanic's lounge on 10 April 1912, according to passenger Father Browne.
 Minimalist work The Sinking of the Titanic (1969–1972) by composer Gavin Bryars is meant to recreate how the music performed by the band would reverberate through the water some time after they ceased performing.
 Harry Chapin's album Dance Band on the Titanic (1977) is dedicated to the Titanic's ensembles and contains a song titled "Dance Band on the Titanic"
 The album Titanic: Music As Heard On The Fateful Voyage (1997), by Ian Whitcomb and the White Star Orchestra, recreates songs played aboard the Titanic the night the ship foundered, and includes detailed liner notes about the music and excursion

Theatre
 The 1997 musical Titanic, with music and lyrics by Maury Yeston and a book by Peter Stone that opened on Broadway,  is set on the ocean liner. It swept the 1997 musical Tony Awards winning all five it was nominated for including the award for Best Musical and Best Score (Yeston's second for both). It ran for 804 performances at the Lunt-Fontanne Theatre. Remarkably, the musical itself did not mention the heroism of the band at all.

See also
 Crew of the Titanic
 Four Chaplains – American military chaplains lost on the SS Dorchester during World War II
  – British troopship disaster, the origin of the Birkinhead Drill''.

References

Notes

Bibliography
  Yvonne Hume is John Law "Jock" Hume's great niece.
 
  Christopher Ward is John "Jock" Law Hume's grandson.

External links
 Memorial to the Titanic Cellists
 Theodore Ronald Bailey
 Theodore Ronald Brailey on Titanic-Titanic.com
 Roger Marie Bricoux
 Roger Marie Bricoux on Titanic-Titanic.Com
 Association Française du Titanic
 John Law Hume (or Hulme)
 John Law Hulme on Encyclopaedia Titanica
 Photograph of John Law Hume's memorial in birth town of Dumfries, SCOTLAND
 Georges Alexandre Krins
 Georges Alexandré Krins on Titanic-Titanic.Com
 Photo of Georges Alexandré Krins

Belgian violinists
Scottish violinists
English Methodists
English violinists
Bandleaders
Musicians
1912 deaths
People from Nièvre
French classical cellists
English pianists
Titanic